Hilmar Örn Jónsson (born 6 May 1996) is an Icelandic athlete specialising in the hammer throw. He represented his country at the 2017 World Championships without reaching the final.

His personal best in the event is 77.10 m set in Hafnarfjördur, Iceland in August 2020.

Both of his parents used to be athletes; his father Jón Sigurjónsson was a hammer thrower while his mother Guðbjörg Lilja Svansdóttir was a high jumper.

International competitions

1No mark in the final

References

1996 births
Living people
Hilmar Orn Jonsson
Hilmar Orn Jonsson
Hilmar Orn Jonsson
Virginia Cavaliers men's track and field athletes
Icelandic Athletics Championships winners
Male hammer throwers
20th-century Icelandic people
21st-century Icelandic people